Lemont Historic District is a national historic district located in Lemont, College Township, Centre County, Pennsylvania, United States.  The district includes 103 contributing buildings in Lemont.  The district is almost exclusively residential with a few scatter community buildings. Notable dwellings include the William Williams House (1840s), Dr. Benjamin Berry House (1835), J.J. Hahn House and Store (1850s), the Lemont Schoolhouse (1870s), John I. Thompson House (1880s), and Dr. J.Y. Dale House (1871).  Notable non-residential buildings include the Thompson and Company Bank Building (1868), Spring Creek Presbyterian Church, and the former Lemont Methodist Church.

It was added to the National Register of Historic Places in 1979.

References

Historic districts on the National Register of Historic Places in Pennsylvania
Georgian architecture in Pennsylvania
Historic districts in Centre County, Pennsylvania
National Register of Historic Places in Centre County, Pennsylvania